Nationality words link to articles with information on the nation's poetry or literature (for instance, Irish or France).

Events

Works published

Births
Death years link to the corresponding "[year] in poetry" article. There are conflicting or unreliable sources for the birth years of many people born in this period; where sources conflict, the poet is listed again and the conflict is noted:

1160:
 Gace Brulé (died 1213) (approx.), French trouvère
 Alamanda de Castelnau (died 1223), trobairitz
 Hélinand of Froidmont (died 1237), medieval poet, chronicler, and ecclesiastical writer in Latin

1162:
 Fujiwara no Teika 藤原定家, also known as "Fujiwara no Sadaie" or "Sada-ie" (died 1241), a widely venerated, Japanese waka poet and (for centuries) extremely influential critic; also a scribe, scholar and extremely influential anthologist of the late Heian period and early Kamakura period;  the Tale of Matsura is generally attributed to him; son of Fujiwara no Shunzei

1165:
 Jean Bodel (died 1210), Old French poet
 Blacatz (died 1237), Occitan troubadour
 Henry VI, Holy Roman Emperor (died 1197), King of Germany, patron of poets, poet

1166:
 Judah Messer Leon (died 1224), French Jewish poet and Rabbi, writing in Hebrew and Aramaic

Deaths
Birth years link to the corresponding "[year] in poetry" article:

1160:
 Hassan Ghaznavi (born unknown), Persian poet
 Akka Mahadevi (born 1130), female Indian Kannada language Vachana sahitya didactic poet
 Ibn Quzman (born 1078), Spanish writer of classical poetry, especially zéjeles, in al-Andalus

1164:
 Abraham ibn Ezra (born 1089), Hebrew scholar and poet in al-Andalus

1166:
 Khoja Akhmet Yassawi (born 1093), Turkish mystic and poet

1167:
 Basava (died 1167), Indian Kannada language Vachana sahitya poet

See also

 Poetry
 12th century in poetry
 12th century in literature
 List of years in poetry

Other events:
 Other events of the 12th century
 Other events of the 13th century

12th century:
 12th century in poetry
 12th century in literature

Notes

12th-century poetry
Poetry